Darreh Chapi-ye Jowkar (also Romanized as Darreh Chapī-ye Jowkār; also known as Darreh Chapī) is a village in Margown Rural District, Margown District, Boyer-Ahmad County, Kohgiluyeh and Boyer-Ahmad Province, Iran. At the 2006 census, its population was 64, in 13 families.

References 

Populated places in Boyer-Ahmad County